Libor Charfreitag (born 11 September 1977 in Trnava) is a former hammer thrower from Slovakia. His personal best throw is 81.81 metres, achieved in June 2003 in Prague.

Career
He was chosen Slovak athlete of the year in 2003. He attended Southern Methodist University in Dallas, Texas.

He had a highly successful season in 2010: he won the gold medal at the 2010 European Athletics Championships, beat all-comers at the 2010 IAAF Continental Cup and finished third in the inaugural IAAF Hammer Throw Challenge series, finishing behind Asian throwers Koji Murofushi and Dilshod Nazarov.

Achievements

References

External links

 
 
 
 

1977 births
Living people
Slovak male hammer throwers
Athletes (track and field) at the 2000 Summer Olympics
Athletes (track and field) at the 2004 Summer Olympics
Athletes (track and field) at the 2008 Summer Olympics
Olympic athletes of Slovakia
SMU Mustangs men's track and field athletes
Sportspeople from Trnava
World Athletics Championships medalists
European Athletics Championships medalists
IAAF Continental Cup winners
Slovak expatriate sportspeople in the United States